Yanakiev is a Bulgarian surname. Notable people with the surname include:

Dimitar Yanakiev (born 1950), Bulgarian rower
Ivo Yanakiev (born 1975), Bulgarian rower
Martin Yanakiev (born 1983), Bulgarian rower
Yavor Yanakiev (born 1985), Bulgarian wrestler

Bulgarian-language surnames